The River Clare is a river in counties Mayo and Galway in Ireland.

It continues south until past Turloughmore, then turns sharply west, flowing north of Claregalway and, thence, further westward into Lough Corrib. The River Corrib flow from the lake into Galway Bay. The Clare is the longest river in the Lough Corrib catchment.

A large section of it is a former turlough, which, at 6.5 square kilometres, used to be Ireland's largest.

The Clare has since the 1950s been subject to ongoing arterial drainage to lower the bed of the river and mitigate flooding. This has resulted in the river being straightened and canalized between ramparts of dredge material making access to the river difficult and compromising its value as a public amenity.  

The river is an important spawning channel for salmon and trout and a noted fishery in its own right for both species. 

Many young teenagers also swim in it during the summer.

References

Rivers of County Mayo
Rivers of County Galway